Secrets are things being hidden.

Secrets may also refer to:

Films 
Secrets (1924 film), a silent film by Frank Borzage
Secrets (1933 film), starring Mary Pickford
"Secrets" (CBS Playhouse), a teleplay broadcast in 1968 as part of the CBS Playhouse series
Secrets (1971 film), starring Jacqueline Bisset
Secrets (1983 film)
Secrets (1992 American film), a television film based upon the Danielle Steel novel
Secrets (1992 Australian film), starring Dannii Minogue and Noah Taylor
Secrets (1995 film), a period drama TV movie directed by Jud Taylor
 Secrets Secrets, a 1985 Italian film

Music 
Secrets (post-hardcore band), an American band from San Diego, California
The Secrets, an American girl group
Secrets, an American fusion jazz band that preceded Dave Matthews Band

Albums 
Secrets (Allan Holdsworth album) (1989)
Secrets (Allison Crowe album) (2004)
Secrets (Brian Culbertson album)
Secrets (The Dooleys album) (1981)
Secrets (Secrets (Gil Scott-Heron and Brian Jackson album) (1978)
Secrets (Herbie Hancock album) (1976)
Secrets (The Human League album) (2001)
Secrets (Mark Feldman album) (2009)
Secrets (Nicki French album) (1995)
Secrets (Robert Palmer album) (1979)
Secrets (Toni Braxton album) (1996)
Secrets, a Stevie Hoang album (2019)

Songs 
"Secrets" (Eternal song)
"Secrets" (Grinspoon song) (2000)
"Secrets" (Mary Lambert song) (2014)
"Secrets" (OneRepublic song) (2009)
"Secrets" (Pink song) (2017)
"Secrets" (Tears for Fears song) (1996)
"Secrets" (Tiësto and KSHMR featuring Vassy song) (2015)
"Secrets" (Regard and Raye song) (2020)
"Secrets" (The Weeknd song), by The Weeknd from Starboy (2016)
"Secrets", by Anastacia from Freak of Nature (2002)
"Secrets", by The Cure from Seventeen Seconds (1980)
"Secrets", by Deep Sea Diver from Secrets
"Secrets", by Golden Earring from Cut (1982)
"Secrets", by HammerFall from Chapter V: Unbent, Unbowed, Unbroken (2005)
"Secrets", by Kylie Minogue from Rhythm of Love (1990)
"Secrets", by Loverboy from Six (1997)
"Secrets", by The Mekons from The Curse of the Mekons (1991)
"Secrets", by Mike Oldfield from Tubular Bells III
"Secrets", by Mission of Burma from Vs. (1982)
"Secrets", by N-Dubz from Uncle B
"Secrets", by Nicki French from Secrets (1995)
"Secrets", by Opshop from You Are Here (2004)
"Secrets", a song by Shirley Bassey (1965)
"Secrets", by State Champs from Around the World and Back (2015)
"Secrets", by Symphony X from The Damnation Game (1995)
"Secrets", by Van Halen from Diver Down (1982)
"Secrets", by will.i.am from Dexter's Laboratory: The Hip-Hop Experiment (2002)
"Secrets", by The Zutons from Tired of Hanging Around

Television

Series and programs
Secrets (Australian TV series), a 1993 adventure series
Secrets (Irish TV series), a 1990–1993 light entertainment show
Secrets (Black and Blue), a 1973 British TV play by Michael Palin and Terry Jones
Judith Krantz's "Secrets", a 1992 miniseries written by Judith Krantz

Episodes
"Secrets" (8 Simple Rules), 2004
"Secrets" (Ben 10), 2006
"Secrets" (Dark), 2017
"Secrets" (NCIS), 2012
"Secrets" (New Girl), 2012
"Secrets" (Roseanne), 1992
"Secrets" (Stargate SG-1), 1998
"Secrets" (The Walking Dead), 2011

Other uses
Secrets (1922 play), a play by Rudolf Besier and May Edginton
Secrets (novel), a 2002 novel by Jacqueline Wilson
Secrets, a 1985 novel by Danielle Steel

See also
Secret (disambiguation)
Secrets and Lies (disambiguation)
Secrets of the Heart (disambiguation)
Secrecy (disambiguation)
Little Secrets (disambiguation)